Dejan Ranković (born 25 July 1976) is a Serbian former professional footballer who played as a goalkeeper.

Career

Smederevo
Born in Smederevo, Ranković passed through the youth ranks of the club then called Sartid. He was later loaned to Železničar Smederevo in order to gain experience. Later on, Ranković also spent some time at Dubočica while serving his military duty in Leskovac.

In the summer of 2000, Ranković returned to Sartid and played three games in the 2000–01 season. He also sat on the bench in all four matches in the 2001 UEFA Intertoto Cup. However, with the arrival of Dragan Žilić and Nebojša Milekić, Ranković was sent out on loan to Bosnian side Slavija Sarajevo for the rest of the 2001–02 season.

In the summer of 2002, Ranković made another return to Sartid and became a member of the squad that won the Serbia and Montenegro Cup in the 2002–03 season. He began receiving more playing time after the departure of Žilić in the summer of 2004. Following the club's relegation from the top flight in 2008, Ranković established himself as the team's first-choice goalkeeper and helped them earn promotion back straight away. He continued playing regularly for the side over the next three seasons.

Later career
In July 2012, Ranković moved to fellow Serbian SuperLiga club Sloboda Užice on a free transfer. He missed just one league game in the 2012–13 season, as the team narrowly fell out of a UEFA Europa League spot. In the following campaign, Ranković again missed just one league match, but failed to help the side avoid relegation from the top flight.

During the 2014–15 and 2015–16 seasons, Ranković played regularly for Serbian First League club Sloga Petrovac.

Personal life
Nicknamed Šnicla (Serbian for "schnitzel"), Ranković is a car mechanic, owning and maintaining an oldsmobile from 1968.

Career statistics

Honours
Sartid Smederevo
 Serbia and Montenegro Cup: 2002–03

References

External links
 
 
 

Association football goalkeepers
Expatriate footballers in Bosnia and Herzegovina
First League of Serbia and Montenegro players
FK Dubočica players
FK Slavija Sarajevo players
FK Sloboda Užice players
FK Sloga Petrovac na Mlavi players
FK Smederevo players
Serbia and Montenegro expatriate footballers
Serbia and Montenegro expatriate sportspeople in Bosnia and Herzegovina
Serbia and Montenegro footballers
Serbian First League players
Serbian footballers
Serbian SuperLiga players
Sportspeople from Smederevo
1976 births
Living people